This list of places of worship in Berlin records past and present places of worship in the city. The list is organised as a sortable table assorted following the given names of the various institutions.

Table of past and present places of worship in Berlin
By clicking on the buttons the list can be ordered along the following features:
main name element (using a uniformed name variant, neglecting differences like Lutherkirche or Martin-Luther-Kirche),
locality or zone of Berlin,
alternative name (colloquial, or also former names),
namesake (also e.g. patron saint, where this applies),
year of erection / establishment or adaptation to religious usage,
religion or denomination,
religious body, to which the local congregation is affiliated or which owns the building outright,
borough of Berlin.

For the names of the religions and denominations the table uses abbreviations (see section Abbreviations for religions and denominations). The religious bodies are abbreviated in the table, a number of abbreviations are officially used and therefore derive from the native named of the bodies (see section Abbreviations for religious bodies. For the names of the twelve boroughs the table uses the following forms (see section Abbreviations used for the borough names. The table does not claim to record the exact data for every entry.

Abbreviations for religions and denominations
Abbreviations for religions and denominations used in the table:

Abbreviations for religious bodies
Abbreviations for religious bodies used in the table, a number of abbreviations are officially used and therefore derive from the native named of the bodies:

Abbreviations used for the borough names
For the names of the twelve boroughs the table uses the following forms:

Charlottenburg-Wilmersdorf = C-W
Friedrichshain-Kreuzberg = F-K
Lichtenberg = Licht.-bg
Marzahn-Hellersdorf = M-H
Mitte = Mitte
Neukölln = Neuk.
Pankow = Pankow
Reinickendorf = Rein.-df
Spandau = Spand.
Steglitz-Zehlendorf = S-Z
Tempelhof-Schöneberg = T-S
Treptow-Köpenick = T-K

References
 Sibylle Badstübner-Gröger, Michael Bollé, Ralph Paschke et al., Handbuch der Deutschen Kunstdenkmäler / Georg Dehio: 22 vols., revis. and ext. new ed. by Dehio-Vereinigung, Berlin and Munich: Deutscher Kunstverlag, 22000, vol. 8: Berlin, p. 496. .
Ingrid Bartmann-Kompa, Horst Büttner, Horst Drescher, Joachim Fait, Marina Flügge, Gerda Herrmann, Ilse Schröder, Helmut Spielmann, Christa Stepansky, and Heinrich Trost, Die Bau- und Kunstdenkmale in der DDR: Hauptstadt Berlin: 2 parts, Institut für Denkmalpflege (ed.) (11983), Berlin: Henschelverlag Kunst und Gesellschaft, 21984
Karin Köhler, Christhard-Georg Neubert and Dieter Wendland, Kirchen und Gotteshäuser in Berlin: Eine Auswahl, Berliner Arbeitskreis City-Kirchen (ed.), Berlin: Evangelische Kirche in Berlin-Brandenburg, 2000, pp. 76–78. .
 Günther Kühne and Elisabeth Stephani, Evangelische Kirchen in Berlin (11978), Berlin: CZV-Verlag, 21986, .
 Sven Scherz-Schade, Kirchen in Berlin. Kirchen, Synagogen, Moscheen und Tempel, Berlin: Berlin Story, 2005, .
Hermann Simon, Jüdisches Berlin, Berlin: Jüdische Presse, 2003, .
 Marina Wesner, Kreuzberg und seine Gotteshäuser, Kreuzberg Museum (ed.), Berlin: Berlin Story, 2007, .

External links

 Lebenslaeufe Berliner Kirchenbauten
 Mahnmal "Flammenwand" - Synagogen Berlins on Berlin von A bis Z
 Sakralbauten in Berlin

Notes

 List
 Places of worship
 List
 Places of worship
Berlin
Worsh